The Cape Dory 33 is an American sailboat that was designed by Carl Alberg as  cruiser and first built in 1980.

The Cape Dory 33 design was developed into the Cape Dory 330 in 1985.

Production
The design was built by Cape Dory Yachts in the United States. The company completed 124 examples of the design between 1980 and 1985, but it is now out of production.

Design
The Cape Dory 33 is a recreational keelboat, built predominantly of fiberglass, with a balsa-cored deck and teak wooden cockpit coamings and trim. It has a masthead sloop rig  or optional cutter rig, a spooned raked stem, a raised counter transom, a keel-mounted rudder controlled by a wheel and a fixed long keel. It displaces  and carries  of lead ballast.

The mainsheet is attached to a mainsheet traveler on the bridge deck. There are five winches for the mainsail halyard, genoa halyard, jiffy reefing and the genoa sheets.

The sleeping accommodation is somewhat unconventional, with a single berth mounted in the port side of bow, with a seat and bureau in that cabin. The berth may be also converted into a double. In the main cabin are settee berths, including one that converts to a double and a third quarter berth in the aft main cabin, partially under the cockpit and adjoining the navigation table. The head is forward and to the port side and includes a privacy door and shower. The galley is on the port side, at the bottom of the companionway steps and includes a three-burner, alcohol-fired stove. The cabin sole is made from teak and holly.

Ventilation is provided by two opening hatches, one each above the main cabin and the bow cabin. There are also five opening bronze ports on each side of the cabin and also dorade vents.

Operational history
The boat is supported by an active class club that organizes racing events, the Cape Dory Sailboat Owners Association.

Reviewer Richard Sherwood noted in 1994, "like all Cape Dory boats, the 33 is designed by Carl Alberg, has a full keel, and has a medium-aspect rig. Ballast is 42 percent of displacement. Beam is wide and is extended well aft."

See also
List of sailing boat types

Related development
Cape Dory 330

Similar sailboats
Abbott 33
Alajuela 33
Arco 33
C&C 33
CS 33
Endeavour 33
Hans Christian 33
Hunter 33
Hunter 33.5
Mirage 33
Nonsuch 33
Tanzer 10
Viking 33
Watkins 33

References

Keelboats
1980s sailboat type designs
Sailing yachts
Sailboat type designs by Carl Alberg
Sailboat types built by Cape Dory Yachts